Mance is a surname. Notable people with the surname include:

Antonio Mance, Croatian footballer
Charlie Mance, Australian soldier
Dragan Mance, Yugoslav footballer 
Henry Christopher Mance (1840–1926), inventor of the Mance Heliograph for communication
Henry Osborne Mance (1875–1960), British Brigadier-General (son of above)
Jeanne Mance (1606–1673), founder of Montreal
Jonathan Mance, Baron Mance, British jurist
Joshua Mance, Olympic Medalist, U.S.A Sprinter
Junior Mance, American jazz pianist and composer
Mary Arden, Lady Arden of Heswall, Baroness Mance, The Lady Mance (married name: Mary Howarth Arden Mance), British Supreme Court Justice; wife of Jonathan Mance, Baron Mance

See also

 
 Mance (disambiguation)